Ngugo is a town in the southeastern Nigeria located near the city of Owerri.

References 

Towns in Imo State